Shushensky (masculine), Shushenskaya (feminine), or Shushenskoye (neuter) may refer to:
Shushensky District, a district of Krasnoyarsk Krai, Russia
Shushenskoye, an urban-type settlement in Krasnoyarsk Krai, Russia